Siobhan Teresa Hayes (born 21 July 1974) is an English actress. She is known for her roles as Abi Harper in the BBC sitcom My Family and Sandy in the BBC radio series Absolute Power.

Career
Hayes portrayed Abi Harper, a clumsy and dim-witted student in the British sitcom My Family, a role she held between 2002 and 2008, when the character became a nun, allowing a potential return. She has also made guest appearances in Little Britain, Paul Merton: The Series, Agatha Christie's Marple, Birds of a Feather, and The Bill. Her early appearances included portraying a pupil of Class 5C onwards from 1991, in the series Up the Garden Path.

In 2005, she was a contestant on the third series of the BBC competition Strictly Come Dancing, paired with professional Matthew Cutler. The couple were the first to be eliminated. On 1 February 2008, it was announced that Hayes would be joining EastEnders, in the role of Melinda, the partner of the show's returning Ricky Butcher portrayed by Sid Owen. This was Hayes' second role in EastEnders, as she portrayed Jane on 4 July 1991. Hayes starred in the 2011 British live action 3D family comedy film Horrid Henry: The Movie, portraying the role of the titular character's mother. In 2022, Hayes appeared in an advert for Specsavers and also featured in the Christmas advert for McDonald's.

Filmography

References

External links
 

1974 births
Living people
20th-century British actresses
21st-century British actresses
British film actresses
British radio actresses
British television actresses